Larz Bourne (February 8, 1916 – March 14, 1993) was an American cartoon writer for Famous Studios, Hanna-Barbera, DePatie-Freleng Enterprises, and Terrytoons.

Career
Bourne started his career in 1937 after graduating from Chicago Professional School of Cartooning. He was the creator of Deputy Dawg. He died in 1993 at the age of 77.

Work
 The Astronut Show
 Hot Stuff the Little Devil
 The Pink Panther Show
 Tom and Jerry
 Casper's Halloween Special
 The All New Popeye Hour
 Jabberjaw
 The Pebbles and Bamm-Bamm Show
 Josie and the Pussycats
 Cattanooga Cats
 ''Dastardly and Muttley in their Flying Machines

References

External links

 

1916 births
1993 deaths
American cartoonists
Animation screenwriters
Hanna-Barbera people
20th-century American screenwriters
Famous Studios people
Terrytoons people